The third campaign of the Dungeons & Dragons web series Critical Role premiered on October 21, 2021; it is set after the conclusion of the second campaign and Exandria Unlimited. The series stars Marisha Ray, Ashley Johnson, Laura Bailey, Travis Willingham, Liam O'Brien, Taliesin Jaffe,  Sam Riegel as the players with Matthew Mercer as the Dungeon Master. Campaign three airs each Thursday at 7 p.m. PT on Critical Role Productions' Twitch and YouTube channels except for the last Thursday of each month.

The campaign is an actual play which follows the Bells Hells, a party of adventurers, in their travels across the continent of Marquet. The campaign begins a few months before the Apogee Solstice, a celestial event which influences the ley lines of Exandria and magnifies magical abilities. The party gets drawn into the mystery surrounding Exandria's second moon Ruidus and the superstitions around the Ruidusborn, people born during spontaneous flares of the red moon. They eventually discover that the gods crafted Ruidus to imprison an ancient evil and that the Ruby Vanguard – founded and led by Martinet Ludinus Da'leth – seek to free this entity during the Apogee Solstice. The Bells Hells have attempted to prevent this by targeting the Malleus Keys, magical devices built by the Ruby Vanguard to aid their ritual.

Cast

Main 
Campaign 3 has maintained the previous Campaign 2 main cast members, with seven players and the Dungeon Master. The characters met in the city of Jrusar and later named their adventuring party the Bells Hells after a fallen member.

Marisha Ray as Laudna, a human (Hollow One) warlock/sorcerer who died shortly before the Whitestone Rebellion in 810 PD and was resurrected by necromantic magics; she has since occasionally heard the voice of the deceased Delilah Briarwood. She wandered for decades before meeting Imogen in the Taloned Highlands; the two later travelled to Jrusar in 843 PD. Laudna was killed by Otohan Thull of the Ruby Vanguard during a battle at the Paragon's Call fortress which led the Bells Hells to go on a successful quest to magically resurrect her.
Ashley Johnson as Fearne Calloway, a Ruidusborn faun druid who travelled to the Material Plane from the Feywild to explore and find her parents. She can summon a wildfire spirit which appears as a fiery monkey named Little Mister. She met Orym and Dorian, along with other adventurers, in Emon and they formed the group known as the Crown Keepers. In the summer of 843 PD, she journeyed to Jrusar with Orym and Dorian to support Orym's mission.
Laura Bailey as Imogen Temult, a Ruidusborn human sorcerer with psionic magic who has reoccurring dreams of a red storm. She and her best friend Laudna travelled to Jrusar to investigate the origins of her psionic abilities and Laudna's necromantic abilities. Her mother, Liliana Temult, left when she was a child; the party's investigation into Ruidius leads them to discover that Liliana is an Exaltant Ruidusborn and a general in the Ruby Vanguard.
Travis Willingham as: 
 Sir Bertrand Bell, a human fighter who travelled with Vox Machina to the plane of Pandemonium in 812 PD and in the following decades, exaggerated his accomplishments. After an encounter with animated furniture in Jrusar, he introduced the group to Lord Ariks Eshteross. When he was separated from the party one evening, the dwarf Dugger ambushed and killed him – the party avenges him and later names the group the Bells Hells in his honor.
 Chetney Pock O'Pea, a gnome blood hunter/rogue who is also a woodworking artisan. He left Uthodurn in search of aid for his lycanthropy. He approaches the Bells Hells to ask for help searching for a man; following this, he joins the group as a full member.
Liam O'Brien as Orym of the Air Ashari, a halfling fighter on a mission from Keyleth of the Air Ashari to investigate an attack in Marquet. This attack was similar to an attack on Keyleth in 837 PD which left Orym's husband Will dead. He travelled to Jrusar with other members of the Crown Keepers.
Matthew Mercer as the Dungeon Master, who organizes the gameplay, describes what effects the player characters' actions have on the world and narrative, and plays the non-player characters (NPCs).
Taliesin Jaffe as Ashton Greymoore, an earth genasi barbarian who attacked Jiana Hexum's home in Jrusar with a group called the Nobodies and was gravely injured; they were abandoned by the group and have been paying off their debt to Hexum since. On a job, they discovered Fresh Cut Grass and helped the automaton bury their companions. They later convince the Bell Hells to take a job from Hexum which pays off their debt to her.
Sam Riegel as Fresh Cut Grass (FCG), an automaton cleric with ancient Aeorian design who was reassembled by the tinkerer Dancer in 838 PD. They are the surviving member of the party known as the Division of Public Benefit. They are keen to support the endeavors of the other members of the group which would become known as the Bells Hells. They initially believe that they were built by Dancer but the party learns FCG was a pre-Divergence Harmonious Aeormaton. While they don't have memories of this time period, FCG fears that they are one of the secret assassin Aermatons after learning that they repressed memories of killing the other members of the Division of Public Benefit after going berserk.

Guests 
Additionally, the following guests have made appearances:

Robbie Daymond as Dorian Storm, an air genasi bard who travelled to Jrusar with Orym and Fearne and helped form the Bells Hells. He later leaves the group to help smuggle his brother out of Marquet and rejoins the other members of the Crown Keepers in Tal'Dorei.
Erika Ishii as Yu Suffiad, a changeling warlock/paladin who works for Sorrowlord Zathuda, Grove Captain of the Unseelie Court. They were tasked with hunting down Fearne's parents and recovering an object which they stole.
Christian Navarro as F.R.I.D.A. (Far Ranging Integrating Defense Aeromaton), an automaton fighter/rogue/cleric with ancient Aeorian design who is an companion of Deanna. Similar to FCG, they were brought back to life by a mysterious figure known as "D".
Aabria Iyengar as Deanna Leimert, a gnome cleric of the Dawnfather. She and Chetney are exes; after they broke up, Deanna married, had a family and died. Her husband went on a quest and found a cleric who brought Deanna back to life two hundred years later.

Background
The story takes place after the events of the second campaign and the limited series Exandria Unlimited. It is set on the continent of Marquet, which was briefly visited during the Vox Machina campaign. SyFy Wire highlighted that Marquet is "home to massive deserts, mountains, and even a volcano" and that it is "uncharted territory for the series".

Multiple characters in this campaign are returning characters. Dorian, Orym, and Fearne premiered in Exandria Unlimited while Bertrand premiered in the one-shot "Search For Grog". "Mercer noted that both Johnson and O'Brien brought character concepts they were toying with for Campaign 3 over to Exandria Unlimited, where they had the chance to develop them with Aabria Iyengar. There was no expectation to carry the characters over to Campaign 3, but the two players enjoyed the characters so much, they decided to keep using them moving forward. Daymond was brought in a special guest to help carry them forward over into Campaign 3". Willingham's second character, Chetney, was inspired by a character he had previously played in the non-canon one-shot "The Night Before Critmas". Additionally, Mercer has brought back several player characters from previous campaigns as NPCs such as Vox Machina's Keyleth and Pike and The Mighty Nein's Caleb and Beau.

Production and format
The format is largely unchanged from the later episodes of the first campaign, with videos of the cast and any battlemaps presented in 3-5-hour episodes. Technical changes however were introduced during the run of the second campaign which have carried over to the third campaign such as subtitles, character information and pre-recording. Since Campaign Two Episode 54, episodes are transcribed by a professional transcription service. Prior to the COVID-19 pandemic, the show had broadcast live, but has been pre-recorded since Campaign Two Episode 100. A new set, designed by professional amusement park designers Shaun Ellis and Polly Hodges, was built for the third campaign. The cast are no longer divided into socially distanced individual tables, but returned instead to a common table as had been the case prior to the pandemic. The campaign features "enhanced set designs, music, lighting and effects, along with improved sound (each actor will have an individual mic)."

The show airs each Thursday at 19:00 PT on Critical Role's Twitch and YouTube channels. In a change from the previous campaign, campaign three of Critical Role will not air new episodes on the last Thursday of every month; instead, other content by the studio will air in its time slot. The third campaign's premiere was simulcast live in Cinemark Theatres along with the regular Twitch and YouTube livestream. Similarly, the 17th episode of the third campaign was simulcast in Cinemark Theatres, Landmark Theatres, and Cinépolis alongside the regular livestream as part of their 7th anniversary celebration. The show went on hiatus from the end of May 2022 until June 30, 2022.

Episodes

2021

2022

2023

Notes

References 

2020s YouTube series
3